Edvard Kožušník (born 30 January 1971) is a Czech politician for the Civic Democratic Party (ODS). He served as a Member of the European Parliament from 2009 to 2014 and is the former Chief of Staff to the President of the Czech Senate, Přemysl Sobotka. He was an ODS candidate for European Parliament election in 2009 and received the seventh largest number of preference votes in the party. He has been the Deputy Minister of Industry and Trade of the Czech Republic since January 2022.

Political career
Kožušník was one of the team responsible for launching Czech governmental think-tank eStat.cz. Subsequently he began campaigning for the abolition of concessionary fees in the Czech Republic.

In 2014, he ran for leadership of ODS, but was defeated by Petr Fiala.

During the 2018 presidential election campaign, Kožušník joined Mirek Topolánek's team.

Personal life
Kožušník's wife is Spanish and they have two children.

References

External links
 Official website

1971 births
Living people
Civic Democratic Party (Czech Republic) MEPs
MEPs for the Czech Republic 2009–2014
Politicians from Olomouc